Gorge Dam is one of three dams along the upper Skagit River in Whatcom County, Washington and part of the Skagit River Hydroelectric Project that supplies Seattle with some of its power needs. Construction on the original, wooden Gorge Dam began in 1921, with the generators formally started by President Calvin Coolidge on September 17, 1924. In 1961, a new Gorge High Dam, made of concrete, was completed to replace the original Gorge Dam.

In 2020, the Upper Skagit Indian Tribe created an online petition calling for the removal of the Gorge Dam.

See also 

 List of dams and reservoirs in Washington
 Skagit River

References

External links

Historic American Engineering Record (HAER) documentation, filed under Newhalem, Whatcom County, WA:

Dams in Washington (state)
Seattle City Light dams
Buildings and structures in Whatcom County, Washington
Historic American Engineering Record in Washington (state)
Hydroelectric power plants in Washington (state)
United States power company dams
Dams on the Skagit River